Entenza is a surname. Notable people with the surname include:
Matt Entenza, Minnesota lawyer and politician 
John Entenza (1903–1984), pivotal figure in the growth of modernism in California
Alonso Fajardo de Entenza (d. 1624, in the Philippines)
Luisa de Entenza y Cascales Pacheco, Lady of Espinardo, daughter of don Alfonso de Entenza
Alfonso de Entenza Pacheco, Lord of Espinardo

See also
Entença (disambiguation)